The Cushing Refiners was the final moniker of the  minor league baseball teams based in Cushing, Oklahoma in 1921 and from 1923 to 1925. Cushing played as members of the Class D level Southwestern League in 1921, Oklahoma State League from 1923 to 1924 and Southwestern League in 1925. 

Baseball Hall of Fame member Carl Hubbell made his professional debut with the 1923 Cushing Refiners.

History
Minor league baseball began in Cushing, Oklahoma in 1921. On August 3, 1921, the Parsons Parsons of the Class D level  Southwestern League moved from Parsons, Kansas to Cushing. Parsons was 26–57 at the time of the move. The team finished the 1921 season as the Cushing Oilers. The team was 8–53 in Cushing, before finishing 8th with an overall record of 34-110. The team was managed by G. C. "Kitty" Knight and Lefty Wilson. In 1922, the Southwestern League became a Class C League and Cushing did not return.

The Cushing Refiners joined the Oklahoma State League for the 1923 season. The Refiners finished in 2nd place in the eight–team league with a 67–53 record, 2.0 games behind the 1st place Duncan Oilers. The Refiners were managed by Ned Pettigrew. In 1923, Baseball Hall of Fame inductee Carl Hubbell made his professional debut for the Cushing Refiners. Pettigrew had given Hubbell a tryout and subsequently signed him to a contract to play for Cushing. Hubbell was age 20 in 1923 and had worked for an oil company after graduating from high school in Meeker, Oklahoma.

In 1924, the Oklahoma State League permanently folded on July 8, 1924. The Cushing Refiners were 49–27 and in 3rd place when the league folded. The Refiners were again managed by Ned Pettigrew.

After the Oklahoma State folded, the Cushing Refiners rejoined the six–team Class D level Southwestern League in 1925. The Oilers were 64–65 and finished 4th in the Southwestern League, 9.5 games behind the 1st place Salina Millers. The manager was Frank Thompson. The Cushing franchise was replaced by Ponca City Poncans in the 1926 Southwestern League. There has not been another minor league team in Cushing.

The ballparks
The 1921 Cushing Oilers were noted to have played home games at Speedway Park. The ballpark was reportedly located north of town on North Little Avenue, where a bowling alley currently stands.  

Starting in 1923, the Cushing Refiners reportedly played home games at a new facility called Cushing Ball Park.  That ballpark was noted to have been located on West Moses Street on the southeast corner of the railroad crossing for the now-abandoned Missouri-Kansas-Texas Railroad tracks, which intersected West Moses between Violet and Puckett Avenues.

Timeline

Season-by-season

Notable alumni

Elon Hogsett (1925)
Carl Hubbell (1923) Inducted to the Baseball Hall of Fame in 1947
Ned Pettigrew (1923–1924, MGR)
Oscar Roettger (1921)
Andy Rush (1921)
Frank Thompson (1925, MGR)

See also
Cushing Refiners players
Cushing Oilers players

References

External links
Baseball Reference

Defunct minor league baseball teams
Sports teams in Oklahoma
Baseball teams established in 1923
Baseball teams disestablished in 1925
1923 establishments in Oklahoma
1925 disestablishments in Oklahoma
Defunct baseball teams in the United States
Defunct baseball teams in Oklahoma
Professional baseball teams in Oklahoma
Defunct Southwestern League teams
Payne County, Oklahoma